Elar Char Adhyay is a 2012 Bengali film. The film is directed by Bappaditya Bandopadhyay, produced by Dreamz Movies and Entertainment Pvt. Ltd. and based on Rabindranath Tagore's 1934 novel Char Adhyay.

Plot 
The film is set in India under British Raj in 1940s. Indranath is a leader of a group which is fighting for Indian independence. Ela is the teacher of the group. Ela is caught in a dilemma between her love for Atindra and her commitment towards her country.

Location 

Mostly the shooting location of Elar Char Adhyay is in Ichapur Nawabganj, a beautiful city near the bank of Ganges in North 24 Parganas West Bengal. In the movie, the palace picturized as Ela's home is originally named as Mandal Bhavan, which is one of the oldest and heritage palace of Ichapur. The school where Ela was teaching is Sridhar Bansidhar High School which is more than 100 years old. The arrival of Atin is shot in Ichapur Mandal Ghat, which is also one of the oldest Ghat of Ichapur.

Cast 
 Paoli Dam
 Indraneil Sengupta
Deepankar Dey
Shamaun Ahmed
 Rudranil Ghosh
 Arunima Ghosh
 Barun Chanda
 Kamalika Chanda
 Vikram Chatterjee
 Nitya Ganguly

See also 
 Muktodhara, a 2012 Bengali film

References

External links
 

2012 films
Films based on works by Rabindranath Tagore
Bengali-language Indian films
2010s Bengali-language films
Films directed by Bappaditya Bandopadhyay